Wilbur Arlington Tarbert (September 10, 1904 – November 27, 1946) was a reserve outfielder in Major League Baseball who played from  through  for the Boston Red Sox. Listed at 6' 0", 160 lb., Tarbert batted and threw right-handed. A native of Cleveland, Ohio, he attended Ohio State University.

In a 39-game career, Tarbert was a .186 hitter (16-for-86) with six runs, seven RBI, two doubles, and one stolen base with no home runs.

Tarbert died at the age of 42 in his hometown of Cleveland, Ohio.

External links

Retrosheet

Major League Baseball outfielders
Boston Red Sox players
Ohio State University alumni
Baseball players from Cleveland
1904 births
1946 deaths